Danny Boy and Other Songs I Love to Sing is the eighth studio album by American pop singer Andy Williams and was released early in 1962 by Columbia Records. This was his first project after leaving Cadence Records, where his albums each had a specific theme, and his first in a series of LPs that covered songs established on stage and screen and other hits from the pop chart and the Great American Songbook. This trend would not be interrupted until his 1966 album The Shadow of Your Smile hinted at a shift toward contemporary material with its inclusion of songs first recorded by the Beatles.

The album made its debut on Billboard magazine's Top LP's chart in the issue dated March 3 of that year and stayed around for 36 weeks, eventually reaching number 19.

The album's first single, "Danny Boy", debuted on the Billboard Hot 100 chart in the issue dated October 30, 1961, and reached number 64 during its six-week stay. It fared even better as his first single to appear on Billboard's recently christened Easy Listening chart, peaking at number 15 and only hinting at the even greater success Williams would have with the Easy Listening audience.

The album was released on compact disc for the first time by Sony Music Distribution on May 15, 2001, as tracks 1 through 12 on a pairing of two albums on one CD with tracks 13 through 24 consisting of Williams's Columbia album from April 1962, Moon River and Other Great Movie Themes.    It was also released as one of two albums on one CD by Collectables Records on February 5, 2002, the other album being Williams's Columbia album from January 1964, The Wonderful World of Andy Williams. Collectables included this CD in a box set entitled Classic Album Collection, Vol. 2, which contains 15 of his studio albums and two compilations and was released on November 29, 2002.

Reception

Allmusic's William Ruhlmann wrote that this was an "entertaining collection" and "features some excellent performances of well-known tunes."

Track listing

Side one
 "Danny Boy" (Frederick Weatherly) – 2:56
 "Tammy" from Tammy and the Bachelor (Ray Evans, Jay Livingston) – 3:08
 "The Twelfth of Never" (Jerry Livingston, Paul Francis Webster) – 2:53
 "I'm Old Fashioned" from You Were Never Lovelier (Jerome Kern, Johnny Mercer) – 3:00
 "Come to Me, Bend to Me" from Brigadoon (Alan Jay Lerner, Frederick Loewe) – 3:25
 "Secret Love" from Calamity Jane (Sammy Fain, Paul Francis Webster) – 3:16

Side two
 "The Heather on the Hill" from Brigadoon (Lerner, Loewe) – 3:02
 "Can I Forget You" from High, Wide, and Handsome (Oscar Hammerstein II, Kern) – 3:44
 "It Could Happen to You" from And the Angels Sing (Johnny Burke, Jimmy Van Heusen) – 3:01
 "I Want to Be Wanted" (Kim Gannon, Giuseppe Spotti, Alberto Testa) – 3:20
 "Summertime" from Porgy and Bess (George Gershwin, Ira Gershwin, DuBose Heyward) – 3:07
 "Misty" (Erroll Garner, Burke) – 3:24

Recording dates
From the liner notes for the 2002 CD:

September 27, 1961 - "Danny Boy"
November 3, 1961 - "Tammy", "Misty"
November 6, 1961 - "The Heather on the Hill'", "I Want to Be Wanted"
November 8, 1961 - "I'm Old Fashioned", "Secret Love", "Summertime"
November 10, 1961 - "The Twelfth of Never", "Come to Me, Bend to Me", "Can I Forget You", "It Could Happen to You"

Grammy nomination
The single "Danny Boy" brought another of the six Grammy nominations that Williams received over the course of his career, this time in the category for Best Solo Vocal Performance, Male. The winner was Jack Jones for "Lollipops and Roses".

Personnel
From the liner notes for the original album:

Andy Williams – vocals
Robert Mersey – arranger, conductor, producer
Bob Cato – photographer

References

Bibliography

1962 albums
Andy Williams albums
Columbia Records albums